Árpád Vajda  (2 May 1896, Rimaszombat (Rimavská Sobota) – 25 October 1967, Budapest) was a Hungarian chess master. He was also a Doctor of Law and State Science, and worked as chief of police in Budapest.

Vajda was Hungarian Champion in 1928.

He tied for 4-7th at Vienna 1921 (Friedrich Sämisch won); tied for 5-7th at Budapest 1922 (6th HUN-ch, Kornél Havasi won); won at London 1922; took 2nd at Portsmouth 1923; tied for 4-5th at Györ 1924 (7th HUN-ch, Géza Nagy won); tied for 11-12th at Debrecen 1925 (Hans Kmoch won); took 5th at Budapest 1926 (Endre Steiner won); took 11th at Budapest 1926 (1st FIDE Masters, Ernst Grünfeld and Mario Monticelli won);
tied for 5-7th at Kecskemét 1927 (Alexander Alekhine won);
shared 5th at Budapest 1928 (José Raúl Capablanca won); tied for 4-5th at Budapest 1929 (Capablanca won); shared 1st with Adolf Seitz at Ramsgate 1929 (B tournament); tied for 4-7th at Sopron 1934 (Rudolf Spielmann won).

He represented Hungary in Chess Olympiads:
 In 1924 in 1st unofficial Chess Olympiad in Paris (+5 –2 =6) team silver medal and individual 4-6th place (Championship Final, Hermanis Matisons won);
 In 1926 in 2nd unofficial Chess Olympiad in Budapest – team gold medal and individual 11th place (1st FIDE Masters);
 In 1927 at third board in 1st Chess Olympiad in London (+5 –3 =5) team gold medal;
 In 1928 at third board in 2nd Chess Olympiad in The Hague (+6 –1 =9) team gold medal;
 In 1930 at third board in 3rd Chess Olympiad in Hamburg (+7 –3 =4) team silver medal;
 In 1931 at third board in 4th Chess Olympiad in Prague (+4 –4 =7) team 10th place;
 In 1933 at third board in 5th Chess Olympiad in Folkestone (+4 –3 =4) team 5th place;
 In 1936 at seventh board in 3rd unofficial Chess Olympiad in Munich (+5 –0 =10) team gold medal;
 In 1937 at reserve board in 7th Chess Olympiad in Stockholm (+0 –2 =2) team silver medal.

Vajda was awarded the International Master (IM) title in 1950.

References

1896 births
1967 deaths
People from Rimavská Sobota
Hungarian chess players
Slovak chess players
Chess International Masters
Chess Olympiad competitors
20th-century chess players